The 1950 Jordan League was the 6th season of Jordan League. Al-Ahli won its 3rd title.

Overview
Al-Ahli won the championship.

References

External links
 Jordan Football Association website
 RSSSF

Jordanian Pro League seasons
Jordan
Jordan
football